Joseph Bianco may refer to:

 Joseph F. Bianco (born 1966), United States federal judge
 Joseph Lo Bianco, professor of language and literacy education